St Cuthbert's Roman Catholic High School is a coeducational secondary school located in the Thornham area of Rochdale in Greater Manchester, England.

History
St Cuthbert's was founded as Bishop Henshaw School in 1968 and was Rochdale's first Catholic secondary school. It became a middle school when Rochdale adopted the three-tier system. It was extended into a secondary school and renamed St Cuthbert's High School during the late 1980s following the Diocese of Salford's decision to scrap the three-tier system. The school moved into new buildings in January 2014.

Feeder schools
It is a voluntary aided school administered by Rochdale Metropolitan Borough Council and the Roman Catholic Diocese of Salford. The school mainly accepts pupils from Alice Ingham RC Primary School, Holy Family RC Primary School, Sacred Heart RC Primary School, St Gabriel's RC Primary School, St John's RC Primary School, St Mary's RC Primary School, St Patrick's RC Primary School and St Vincent's RC Primary School.

Academics 
St Cuthbert's RC High School offers GCSEs and BTECs as programmes of study for pupils.

Specialism choices had previously been picked in year 9 and examined in year 10 to ease pressure on students in year 11, however due to COVID-19 changes have been made.

As of 2021, students select a specialism choice in year 10 and are examined in year 11. The choices include, psychology, physical education, health and social care, performing arts (music, drama, and art), ICT, statistics, astronomy, design and technology,  sociology and extra core.

Notable former pupils
Bishop Henshaw
Paul Rowen, politician and former Member of Parliament (MP) for Rochdale.

St Cuthbert's 
Michael Campbell, musician and member of The Courteeners.
Johny Diba, former footballer who played as a goalkeeper for Rochdale.
Connor Ronan, footballer who plays as a midfielder for Wolverhampton Wanderers.
Axel Tuanzebe, footballer who plays for Manchester United.

References

External links
St Cuthbert's RC High School official website

Secondary schools in the Metropolitan Borough of Rochdale
Catholic secondary schools in the Diocese of Salford
Voluntary aided schools in England
Schools in Rochdale